George Washington Owen (October 20, 1796 – August 18, 1837) was an American attorney and politician who served as a member of the United States House of Representatives for Alabama's 3rd congressional district and the 10th mayor of Mobile.

Early life and education 
Owen was born in Brunswick County, Virginia, in 1796, but moved to Tennessee at a young age. He graduated from the University of Nashville, where he studied law.

Career 
Owen was admitted to the bar in 1816 and moved to Alabama to practice law. He also served in the Alabama House of Representatives. Owen unsuccessfully ran for Congress in 1821 and successfully in 1823 when he became the first representative of Alabama's 3rd congressional district. He served in that position until 1829, when he was succeeded by Dixon Hall Lewis, who later became a member of the United States Senate. Owen was elected mayor of Mobile, Alabama, in 1836, a position in which he served until his death the following year.

Personal life 
In 1823, he married Louise Sarah Hollinger, the daughter of Adam Hollinger (for whom Hollinger's Island is named), who was the great-granddaughter of Mobile co-founder Charles Rochon.

References

1796 births
1837 deaths
Mayors of Mobile, Alabama
Members of the Alabama House of Representatives
People from Brunswick County, Virginia
Democratic-Republican Party members of the United States House of Representatives from Alabama
Jacksonian members of the United States House of Representatives from Alabama
19th-century American politicians
Lawyers from Mobile, Alabama